An action alert is a message that an organization sends to mobilize people, often members of the group and supporters of a specific point of view, calling on them to take action to influence public policy. Typically, action alerts are in reference to a timely issue, where prompt action is needed in order to affect upcoming decisions.

Description
Action alerts are considered a cost-effective and efficient grassroots organizing tool and are employed widely by many advocacy organizations. A well-designed action alert can be a "powerful way to invite people to participate in the processes of a democracy." 

Action alerts may, for instance, ask supporters to:
Contact their legislator to highlight the issue or argue for/against proposed legislation; or
Write a letter to the editor about a specific item in the news.
Action alerts commonly begin by explaining the public policy issue to the recipients, and then tell the reader how they can impact the decision. Action alerts go by many other names. Amnesty International, for instance, refers to them as "Urgent actions".

Organisations that use action alerts

Citizens Against Government Waste
People for the Ethical Treatment of Animals
Electronic Frontier Foundation
Union of Concerned Scientists
American Family Association
Public Citizen
National Right to Work Committee
Tea Party Express
Free Software Foundation
Unrepresented Nations and Peoples Organization
Amnesty International
Human Rights Watch
Corruption Watch (South Africa)
Transparency International
Indonesia Corruption Watch
Anti-Corruption Foundation
Watchdog.org
International Republican Institute

References

Freedom of expression
Public opinion
Amnesty International
Crowd psychology
Politics